Rotundone is a sesquiterpene originally discovered in the tubers of Java grass (Cyperus rotundus).  Rotundone is also present in the essential oils of black pepper, marjoram, oregano, rosemary, basil, thyme, and geranium, as well as in some Syrah wines.  It imparts a peppery aroma.

References

Terpenes and terpenoids